The Colorado River Union High School District (also known as CRUHSD) is the high school district in Bullhead City, Arizona, USA, and surrounding areas. It operates three high schools, River Valley High School and Mohave High School, and CRUHSD Academy. As well as an event center: CRUHSD Anderson Auto Group Fieldhouse. The district's high schools have a combined enrollment of 1,755 students.

The Superintendent of the Colorado River Union High School District is Dr. Tim Richard

Its schools serve students from the Bullhead City Elementary School District and Mohave Valley Elementary School District.

References

External links
 

School districts in Arizona